Mimis Plessas (born 12 October 1924) is a Greek composer born in Athens. He began his career in 1952 and has written music for over 100 films, television and radio programs, and theatrical events. He has worked with such notable Greek singers as Nana Mouskouri, Giannis Poulopoulos, Marinella, Rena Koumioti and lyricist Lefteris Papadopoulos.

Plessas combined the traditions of entehno and laïkó with considerable success, notably making it his own style. His composition work O Dromos in 1969 (The Street) still remains the work with the most sales in the history of the Greek discography.

In 2001 he was honored with the Gold Cross of the Order of the Phoenix.

References
 Article about Mimis Plessas on Musicheaven.gr

External links
 

1924 births
Eurovision Song Contest conductors
Greek songwriters
Greek pianists
Greek classical pianists
Greek conductors (music)
Greek film score composers
Male film score composers
Gold Crosses of the Order of the Phoenix (Greece)
Living people
Male classical pianists
21st-century conductors (music)
21st-century classical pianists
21st-century male musicians
Musicians from Athens